Bence Szirányi (born 17 February 1988) is a Hungarian professional ice hockey defenceman who plays for DVTK Jegesmedvék in the Slovak Extraliga.

External links

1988 births
Living people
Fehérvár AV19 players
Diables Rouges de Briançon players
DVTK Jegesmedvék players
Hungarian ice hockey defencemen
Ice hockey people from Budapest
Újpesti TE (ice hockey) players